IEC 61851 is an international standard for electric vehicle conductive charging systems, parts of which are currently still under development(written 2017). IEC 61851 is one of the International Electrotechnical Commission's group of standards for electric road vehicles and electric industrial trucks and is the responsibility of IEC Technical Committee 69 (TC69).

Standard documents 
IEC 61851 consists of the following parts, detailed in separate IEC 61851 standard documents:

 IEC 61851-1: General requirements
 IEC 61851-21-1: Electric vehicle on-board charger EMC requirements for conductive connection to AC/DC supply
IEC 61851-21-2: Electric vehicle requirements for conductive connection to an AC/DC supply - EMC requirements for off board electric vehicle charging systems
 IEC 61851-23: DC electric vehicle charging station
 IEC 61851-24: Digital communication between a DC EV charging station and an electric vehicle for control of DC charging
 IEC 61851-25: DC EV supply equipment where protection relies on electrical separation

IEC 61851-1 
IEC 61851-1 defines four modes of charging:

References

See also 
 ISO 15118
 IEC 61850
 IEC 62196
 IEC 63110
 OpenEVSE

Electric vehicles
61851